The Complexity of Happiness is a 2015 comedy film written and directed by Gianni Zanasi and starring Valerio Mastandrea and Giuseppe Battiston. It premiered at the 2015 Turin Film Festival.

Cast 

Valerio Mastandrea as Enrico Giusti
Giuseppe Battiston as Carlo Bernini
Hadas Yaron  as Avinoam
Paolo Briguglia as  Matteo Borghi
Maurizio Donadoni as Uncle Umberto
 Teco Celio as  Bernini Senior
 Filippo De Carli as  Filippo Lievi
 Camilla Martini as  Camilla Lievi
 Maurizio Lastrico as  Ivano
 Domenico Diele as Bernini's Assistant
 Daniele De Angelis as  Nicola Giusti

See also 
 List of Italian films of 2015

References

External links 
 

2015 comedy-drama films
Italian comedy-drama films
2010s Italian films